Alfredo Lettieri (February 24, 1928 – October 18, 1975) was an American actor. Active during the 1960s and 1970s, he commonly portrayed villainous characters. He achieved recognition for his performance as mobster Virgil Sollozzo in the crime film The Godfather (1972) and appeared in several other productions alongside Hollywood's biggest screen stars.

Background
Lettieri was an Italian-American who spoke Italian fluently. His brother-in-law was Pasquale Eboli, brother of Genovese crime family boss Thomas Eboli.

Career

1950s to 1960s
Lettieri had a role in the 1958 Perry Mason episode "The Case of the Fugitive Nurse" as Arthur Strome. At the age of 36, he had a role in the television film The Hanged Man (1964).

1970s
Lettieri is best known for his role as Sicilian heroin trafficker Virgil Sollozzo in the 1972 American crime film The Godfather. This was the second film in which he and Marlon Brando had worked together, the first being The Night of the Following Day (1969).

He wrote the film adaptation that became the screenplay for the 1971 gangster movie Villain, which starred Richard Burton and Ian McShane. Lettieri played the henchman, Rudy Butler, in Steve McQueen's 1972 action film, The Getaway, and the menacing hit-man Frank Renda in the 1974 Charles Bronson film, Mr. Majestyk. He played the part of Ciro Musante in the Tonino Valerii-directed 1976 film, Go Gorilla Go.

Death
Lettieri died of a heart attack in 1975.

Filmography

References

External links
 

1928 births
1975 deaths
American people of Italian descent
American male film actors
American male television actors
Male actors from New York City
20th-century American male actors